Diego Murillo Domínguez (born 14 March 2001) is a Spanish footballer who plays as either a central defender or a right back for Málaga CF.

Club career
Murillo was born in Malagón, Ciudad Real, Castilla-La Mancha, and joined Málaga CF's youth setup in 2017, after representing EM FB Ciudad Real and Albacete Balompié. He made his senior debut with the reserves on 13 October 2019, starting in a 2–2 Tercera División home draw against Loja CD.

On 7 June 2022, after establishing himself as a regular starter for the B-team, Murillo renewed his contract until 2024 on 7 June 2022. He made his first team debut on 24 September, coming on as a late substitute for Juanfran in a 1–1 Segunda División home draw against Villarreal CF B.

References

External links
Málaga profile

2001 births
Living people
People from Ciudad Real
Footballers from Castilla–La Mancha
Spanish footballers
Association football defenders
Segunda División players
Tercera División players
Tercera Federación players
Atlético Malagueño players
Málaga CF players